The Thirty-eighth Amendment of the Constitution of Ireland is an amendment to the Constitution of Ireland which altered the provisions regulating divorce. It removed the constitutional requirement for a defined period of separation before a Court may grant a dissolution of marriage, and eased restrictions on the recognition of foreign divorces. The amendment was effected by an act of the Oireachtas, the Thirty-eighth Amendment of the Constitution (Dissolution of Marriage) Act 2019 (introduced as bill no. 57 of 2016).

The bill as introduced did not propose the total deletion of a waiting period from the Constitution, merely a reduction in the required term. After amendments by the Oireachtas, the bill was put to a referendum on 24 May 2019, the same date as the local and European elections. The proposal was approved by 82% of voters. The bill was signed into law on 11 June 2019 by Michael D. Higgins, the President of Ireland.

Background
When the Constitution of Ireland was adopted in 1937, divorce was prohibited by Article 41.3.2°. A referendum held in 1986 to remove this prohibition was defeated. The prohibition was removed after a second referendum held in 1995, which was narrowly approved by 50.28% to 49.72%. The recognition of foreign divorce is regulated by Article 41.3.3°, which was unaffected by the 1995 referendum. The text of these two subsections prior to the 2019 amendment is set out below:

Divorce is regulated in statute law by the Family Law (Divorce) Act 1996, passed after the 1995 amendment, which repeats conditions i, ii and iii of Article 41.3.2° verbatim. Limited recognition of foreign divorce is provided by the Domicile and Recognition of Foreign Divorces Act 1986. In 2015 the Supreme Court called for reform of the 1986 Act.

Legislative history
The bill was introduced in the 32nd Dáil as the Thirty-fifth Amendment of the Constitution (Divorce) Bill 2016, a private member's bill by a backbench TD from the Fine Gael party, Josepha Madigan. It proposed to reduce the period of separation from four years to two years by the substitution of the following text for clause 41.3.2°(i) above:

The Fine Gael-led government agreed to support the bill, thereby permitting it to go second stage in the Dáil on 6 April 2017.  The committee stage was referred to the Select Committee On Justice And Equality, which considered it on 12 July 2017. The Independents 4 Change TD, Clare Daly, wanted the separation period removed from the Constitution and dealt with instead in statute law, by amending the Family Law (Divorce) Act 1996, as allowed under Article Article 41.3.2°(iv). Josepha Madigan said she was "not sure that the Irish people are completely ready for this provision to be taken out of the Constitution". The Solidarity–People Before Profit TD, Ruth Coppinger, proposed the specification of a maximum separation period that would be set by statute law, or a shorter one, or none. The Fine Gael TD, David Stanton, the Minister of State for Equality, Immigration and Integration, said the government would propose substantive amendments to the bill at report stage, which other deputies criticised as rendering the committee stage redundant. The bill passed committee stage unamended.

In November 2017 Madigan was appointed to the government as Minister for Culture, Heritage and the Gaeltacht. Nevertheless, on the Dáil order paper the bill formally remained as a private member's bill rather than a government bill; bills of the former class of proceed more slowly than those of the latter, because less Dáil time is reserved for private members' business.

Government amendments
In January 2019, the government announced that it would propose amendments to the bill at report stage to eliminate the waiting period and to regulate foreign divorce. In March 2019, the government announced the wording for these amendments. It would propose to delete paragraph (i) of Article 41.3.2° and renumber subsequent paragraphs; and to substitute the following for subsection 3°:

The government also published the Draft of a General Scheme of the Family Law (Divorce) (Amendment) Bill 2019, which it said that it would enact if the referendum passed. The promised bill would amend Section 5(1) of Family Law (Divorce) Act 1996 by the substitution of “two years during the previous three years” for “four years during the previous five years”.

Minister Charles Flanagan proposed the amendments to the constitutional bill in the Dáil at report stage on 3 April 2019; they passed unopposed and the bill completed remaining Dáil stages. Flanagan also said that the issue of changing the law on foreign divorces within the terms of the revised Article 41.3.3° would be referred to the Law Reform Commission. The number of the amendment was also changed from 35 to 38, as amendment numbers 36 and 37 had been enacted since the divorce bill was introduced.

The bill passed all stages in the Seanad on 11 April 2019. The following day, Eoghan Murphy, the Minister for Housing, Local Government and Heritage set 24 May 2019 as the date for the referendum.

Referendum
The bill was submitted to referendum on 24 May 2019, the same day as the European Parliament election and local elections. It was the first time that a private member's bill was scheduled for a referendum. The "statement for the information of voters" that appeared on the ballot paper was approved by identical resolutions of the Dáil and Seanad passed immediately after the bill.

The Referendum Commission for the amendment referendum was established on 26 February 2019 with High Court judge Tara Burns appointed as chair. Registration as an "approved body" entitled to campaign for or against the bill was open from 10 April to 25 April.

Campaign
The referendum was overshadowed by campaigning for the simultaneous local and European elections. The lacklustre campaign was attributed to "campaign fatigue" by a campaigner on the "No" side, Seamas de Barra, who is treasurer for the Alliance for the Defence of the Family and Marriage: 

One argument in favour was that couples under the current law often obtain a judicial separation after two years apart and a divorce after four years, thus incurring two sets of legal costs.

Some commentators criticised the bundling into a single amendment bill of two distinct changes (removal of the four-year waiting period and recognition of foreign divorces) thus preventing voters from approving one while rejecting the other. An opinion poll taken on 7–9 May for The Irish Times found 77% of respondents would vote Yes, 8% No, 11% unsure, and 4% would not vote. Among likely voters, 91% favoured Yes.

The amendment was supported by Fine Gael, Fianna Fáil, Sinn Féin, the Labour Party, Solidarity–People Before Profit, Social Democrats and the Green Party, as well as the Law Society of Ireland, Union of Students in Ireland, Free Legal Advice Centres, Irish Council for Civil Liberties, and National Women's Council of Ireland.

Organisations that campaigned for a "No" vote included Richard Greene's "Alliance for Defence of Family and Marriage" and Renua’s European candidate in the Midlands North-West constituency, Michael O’Dowd. Journalist Jennifer Bray suggested that opponents felt that "the race is lost and … mounting a full-scale campaign would be pointless".  David Quinn said the Iona Institute was opposed but did not campaign because "there is very little interest or awareness amongst our supporters on this issue. The stakes aren’t remotely as high as the abortion debate". Denis Nulty, Catholic Bishop of Kildare and Leighlin and chair of the Council for Marriage & Family of the Irish Catholic Bishops' Conference, called on voters to "reflect deeply" and said the amendment's objective was "liberalising divorce rather than supporting marriage".

Result
The proposal was approved.

Legislation
The amendment came into force when the amending act was signed into law on 11 June 2019 by Michael D. Higgins, the President of Ireland.

The concomitant Family Law Bill 2019 was published and introduced in the Dáil on 9 October 2019; among the changes to divorce laws which it proposed were those newly permitted by the constitutional amendment, namely a reduction in the separation period from four to two years, and recognition of divorces granted in the European Union and, post Brexit, in the United Kingdom and Gibraltar. The bill's second reading in the Dáil was moved by David Stanton on 16 October, and it passed remaining Dáil stages that day without opposition. On 23 October the Seanad passed the bill unamended, and then passed a motion for its early signature by the President, who accordingly signed it into law on 25 October as the Family Law Act 2019. The sections reducing the waiting time came into force on 1 December 2019;  the sections recognising foreign divorce have not been commenced.

References

Sources

Citations

External links
 Referendum Commission official website
 Referendum Returning Officer official website
 Divorce Referendum RTÉ News index

2019 in Irish law
2019 in Irish politics
2019 referendums
38
Divorce law
Family law in the Republic of Ireland
38
Marriage reform
Marriage in Ireland
Amendment, 38
2016 in Irish politics
May 2019 events in Ireland
Divorce referendums